The Men's Australian Open 2012 is the men' edition of the 2012 Australian Open, which is a tournament of the PSA World Tour event International (Prize money: $70,000). The event took place in Canberra in Australia from 13 to 18 August. Ramy Ashour won his second Australian Open trophy, beating Omar Mosaad in the final.

Prize money and ranking points
For 2012, the prize purse was $70,000. The prize money and points breakdown is as follows:

Seeds

Draw and results

See also
PSA World Tour 2012
Australian Open (squash)
2012 Women's Australian Open (squash)

References

External links
PSA Australian Open 2012 website
Australian Open official website

Squash tournaments in Australia
Australian Open Squash
2012 in Australian sport